Natalya Petrovna Saiko (born 12 January 1948) is a Soviet and Russian actress. She appeared in more than thirty films since 1969.

Selected filmography
 Confrontation (Противостояние) as Anna Petrova (1985)
 Sofia Kovalevskaya (Софья Ковалевская) as Yulia Lermontova (1985)
 Professor Dowell's Testament (Завещание профессора Доуэля) as Angelika, Monika, Eva (1984)
 Crazy Day of Engineer Barkasov (Безумный день инженера Баркасова) as Zoya Barkasova (1983)
 Golos (Голос) as Yulia Martynova (1982)
 Moon Rainbow (Лунная радуга) as Lyudmila Bakulina (1983)
 Hopelessly Lost (Совсем пропащий) as Mary Jane (1973)

References

External links 

1948 births
Living people
Russian film actresses
Soviet film actresses
Actresses from Tallinn
Honored Artists of the RSFSR
20th-century Russian women